Thomas Belden (before 1793 Thomas Belding) (March 25, 1731 – 1806) was a member of the Connecticut House of Representatives from Norwalk for twelve years, including the sessions of October 1768, May and October 1769, May and October 1770, May and October 1771, May and October 1772, May and October 1773, May and October 1774, May 1775, May 1787, May and October 1778, October 1789, May and October 1793.

Belden was born in Norwalk on March 25, 1731. He was the son of John Belden and Ruhamar Hill, the daughter of Captain John Hill, of Westerly, Rhode Island. He was the grandson of John Belding, early settler, and state representative of Norwalk.

Belden Hill near the Norwalk River in Wilton was named for Thomas Belden.

References 

1731 births
1806 deaths
Members of the Connecticut House of Representatives
Politicians from Norwalk, Connecticut
Yale College alumni
People of colonial Connecticut
19th-century American Episcopalians